Nikita Komarov (born June 28, 1988) is a Belarusian professional ice hockey player currently under contract with SKA Saint Petersburg in the Kontinental Hockey League (KHL) and the Belarusian national team. He formerly signed a one-year deal with HC Dynamo Moscow after a successful trial period on August 19, 2017.

On 15 July 2020, Komarov joined Avangard Omsk, signing a one-year contract as a free agent for the 2020–21 season.

He participated at the 2016 IIHF World Championship.

Awards and honours

References

External links

1988 births
Living people
Avangard Omsk players
Avtomobilist Yekaterinburg players
Belarusian ice hockey forwards
HC Dinamo Minsk players
HC Dynamo Moscow players
People from Navapolatsk
SKA Saint Petersburg players
Traktor Chelyabinsk players
HC Vityaz players
Sportspeople from Vitebsk Region